The 2012 UCI Mountain Bike World Cup included two disciplines: cross-country and downhill.

Cross-country

Downhill

See also
2012 UCI Mountain Bike & Trials World Championships

References
https://web.archive.org/web/20140523092943/http://www.uci.ch/templates/BUILTIN-NOFRAMES/Template3/layout.asp?MenuId=MTUyMTM&LangId=1

External links
 UCI Homepage
 2012 UCI Mountain Bike World Cup Calendar
 UCI pulls 4X from World Cup Circuit!
 DHI1 – Pietermaritzburg – men results
 DHI1 – Pietermaritzburg – women results
 DHI2 – Val di Sole – men results
 DHI2 – Val di Sole – women results
 DHI3 – Fort William – men results
 DHI3 – Fort William – women results
 DHI4 – Mont Saint Anne – men results
 DHI4 – Mont Saint Anne – women results
 DHI5 – Windham – men results
 DHI5 – Windham – women results
 DHI6 – Val d'Isère – men results
 DHI6 – Val d'Isère – women results
 DHI7 – Hafjell – men results
 DHI7 – Hafjell – women results
 XCO1 – Pietermaritzburg – men results
 XCO1 – Pietermaritzburg – women results
 XCO2 – Houffalize – men results
 XCO2 – Houffalize – women results
 XCO3 – Nové Město na Moravě – men results
 XCO3 – Nové Město na Moravě – women results
 XCO4 – La Bresse – men results
 XCO4 – La Bresse – women results
 XCO5 – Mont-Sainte-Anne – men results
 XCO5 – Mont-Sainte-Anne – women results
 XCO6 – Windham – men results
 XCO6 – Windham – women results
 XCO7 – Val d'Isère – men results
 XCO7 – Val d'Isère – women results

UCI Mountain Bike World Cup
Mountain Bike World Cup